Curfew is a British dystopian action drama television series created by Matthew Read for Sky. Starring an ensemble cast led by Sean Bean, Ike Bennett, Adam Brody, Aimee-Ffion Edwards, Phoebe Fox, Thaddea Graham, Guz Khan, Malachi Kirby, Adrian Lester, Andi Osho, Miranda Richardson, Jessye Romeo, Elijah Rowen, Jason Thorpe, Rose Williams, and Billy Zane, the series premiered on 22 February 2019 on Sky One in the United Kingdom and Ireland. In limited areas of the United States, the entire series was released on 24 June 2019 by Spectrum as part of their Spectrum Originals video on demand branding initiative.

Premise
In the near future, Earth is overwhelmed by an unstoppable virus of unknown origin. To protect the population from the virus sweeping across the United Kingdom, a totalitarian government impose a curfew in which anyone caught out between 7pm to 7am will be put into quarantine, if not worse. Curfew focuses on a few lucky groups that are offered the opportunity to compete in an illegal  street race where the finish line ends in the ultimate prize: sanctuary.

The Virus
The initial outbreak of a virus in Scotland is followed by its spread to the rest of the world. Those infected by the virus are mutated into fast, savage and feral creatures (referred to as 'mooks') that attack non-infected humans. Mooks have high endurance and speed, and can only be taken down by heavy arms fire or head shots. They have a severe sensitivity to ultraviolet light; they burn when exposed to it, so they hide during the day and come out to hunt at night. When the virus and the appearance of 'mooks' started to impact everyday life, the curfew was introduced to keep people safe from the infected. In addition to the curfew, major cities, notably London and Manchester, have built walls and implemented checkpoints to control the public and limit the spread of the virus. Bridges across the Thames are also closed during curfew hours.

Because 'mooks' can seemingly respond to certain subsonic frequencies, these are used to lure them away from populated areas.

The virus is transmitted by biting alone; being scratched by a 'mook' does not result in infection, nor is the virus airborne. While a scratch is harmless, it does cause discomfort and mild nausea that is known to pass within a few hours. However, once bitten, an individual will quickly and painfully mutate. It is considered a mercy to kill the infected before they fully turn.

Unbeknownst to the public, the virus is not a natural phenomenon but, actually, a man-made agent originally designed for medical research into cellular regeneration. Unfortunately, the virus mutated unexpectedly during the first human trials in Scotland, and the outbreak occurred as a result of failed containment measures.

Cast

Main

Guest

Joss Carter, Fionn Cox-Davies and Danny Collins portray the creatures.

Episodes

Notes

References

External links
 

2019 British television series debuts
2019 British television series endings
2010s British drama television series
Sky UK original programming
Television series by Tiger Aspect Productions
Television series by Endemol
English-language television shows
Television shows set in Manchester
Television shows shot in Liverpool